Gary Webb (1955–2004) was an American investigative reporter.

Gary Webb may also refer to:
Gary Webb (racing driver) (born 1949), American racing driver 
Gary Webb (artist) (born 1973), British artist
Gary Numan (born 1958), English musician, real name Gary Webb
Gary Webb (golfer) (born 1961), American professional golfer

See also
Garry Webb, Australian criminal also known as Garry David